Zsófia Fegyverneky (born September 29, 1984) is a Hungarian basketball player for Uniqa Sopron and the Hungarian national team.

She participated at the EuroBasket Women 2017.

References

1984 births
Living people
Sportspeople from Pécs
Shooting guards
Hungarian women's basketball players